Pocher, is an Italian toy car brand and former manufacturing company of scale model cars. The company, established by Arnaldo Pocher, was active from 1966 to 2000, and from 2013 the brand name "Pocher" is owned by Hornby.

History

The early years

Arnaldo Pocher was born in 1911 in Trento, Italy. He trained as a goldsmith engraver and went to work in Turin. In the years following the Second World War he became interested in railway modelling and in 1951 he formed Pocher Micromeccanica S.n.c. alongside Corrado Muratore producing train signals, platforms and points using innovative production techniques. Under a change of name, The Corrado Muratore and Arnaldo Pocher Company, they produced finely detailed freight and passenger carriages in white metal and later locomotives and power cars.

Pocher 1:8 model kits 
At the International Toy Fair of Milan in 1966, the Pocher stand astonished the world with its wonderfully detailed 1:8 scale model of the Fiat F2 130HP, the car which won the 1907 French Grand Prix driven by Felice Nazzaro. The model contained 144 high-resistance plastic parts, 173 in brass and 506 in steel, copper, leather, rubber and aluminium. The Company went on to produce ever more detailed models of motoring classics including the 1931–34 Alfa Romeo 2300 Ac Monza, the 1932 Rolls-Royce Phantom II Drophead Sedanca Coupe, the 1932 Alfa Romeo Touring, the Mercedes-Benz 500K/AK containing 2,378 part and then the Rolls-Royce Torpedo Phantom II Convertible with 2,905 parts.

These kits were based on original plans from the manufacturer. Two features present on some models were spoked wire wheels that were assembled spoke by spoke, and engines with working crankshaft and piston assemblies. Assembly was mostly accomplished with threaded fasteners (screws, bolts, nuts) and very little glue. This created finished products that could theoretically be disassembled and repaired or modified. Kits came molded in color and ready painted. Finished preassembled versions were also sold.

In the 1970s Corrado Muratore sold his part of the company to Rivarossi, a bit later Arnaldo Pocher sold his part, too. While Corrado Muratore continued as general manager of Pocher and national sales manager, Arnaldo Pocher left the company.

The product ranges
The earlier high piece and high detail kits were referred to as the Classic line. Later a less assembly intensive line appeared which was called the Prestige line of cars. Classic kits were known for their high piece count and incredible detail such as working brake systems, engines with rotating crankshafts and moving pistons, windows that moved up and down, steering that operated, and when a tiny key was inserted into the dashboard the headlights lit up. Classic kits faithfully represented mostly 1930s cars from Fiat, Alfa Romeo, Bugatti, Mercedes-Benz, and Rolls-Royce. Prestige kits were most often die cast metal bodies and contained about 500 parts. They featured working suspension and opening doors and detailed engines. These kits were designed to provide attractive models that could be built with little difficulty. These were mostly of Ferraris such as the Testarossa and F40, along with a few Porsches. A third line existed which was called Pocher Truck. This consisted of two Volvo trucks using the same assembly method as Prestige - mainly press fit parts with superb detailing. Four separate engine kits were produced that featured the engines from Ferrari Testarossa, Ferrari F40, Volvo, and Bugatti. Of these four kits the Bugatti was the most complex as it had a moving crankshaft and pistons.

All model kits in the automobile line were produced in enormous one eighth scale. The aftermarket products produced to support these kits is a thriving cottage industry and the remaining kits that are unassembled are a rare item. Often cherished, traded, and handed down these do exist today and are available through collector channels.

Hornby and Pocher

After the Lima group went into bankruptcy the Pocher brand was bought by Hornby in 2004.
In December 2012 Hornby announced the "resurgence of a myth" on the official website of Pocher. An official presentation was held on the Nuremberg International Toy Fair on 30 January 2013. Pocher presented the new 1:8 model kit of the Lamborghini Aventador. At Nuremberg 2014 two new models were announced: HK105/6 Lamborghini Huracan and HK107 Ducati Panigale Superbike.

Vestergaard and Pocher
In February 2017, while Hornby was in financial crisis and in need of cash, the Danish importer Vestergaard acquired Pocher and its surplus inventory which included about 1600 Ducati kits. A green version of the Pocher Lamborghini Huracan, kit# HK109, was produced and released under Vestergaard ownership of the brand.

Hornby has recently repurchased ownership of the brand. In October 2020, Hornby's interim results stated "With distribution in 27 countries and with plans to launch more new and varied models in the not too distant future, the Pocher legacy of high-quality large-scale model kits will continue." Furthermore, the website and trade mark continue to be registered to Hornby.

Pocher prestige model list

Pocher Hornby model list

Pocher Classic model list

Pocher truck model list

Pocher engine model list

Further reading
 Giorgio Giuliani, La storia dei treni Rivarossi: sessanta anni di modellismo ferroviario in Italia, Università di Bologna, Facoltà di Lettere e Filosofia, 2008
 Michele Lomolino, Catalogo guida al modellismo ferroviario di Arnaldo Pocher, Palermo, Edizioni ML, 1984
 Edoardo Massucci, Quei giorni in cui facemmo la Pocher, da ACI News, n.4  Ottobre 2003

References

External links

 

Toy cars and trucks
Toy companies established in 1967
Manufacturing companies disestablished in 2003
Italian companies established in 1967
Italian brands
Model manufacturers of Italy
Toy brands
Hornby Railways